The men's 500 metres at the 2003 Asian Winter Games was held on 2 and 3 February 2003 in Hachinohe, Aomori Prefecture, Japan.

Schedule
All times are Japan Standard Time (UTC+09:00)

Records

500 meters

500 meters × 2

Results

References
Results

External links
Schedule

Men 500